Coreopsis gladiata, the coastalplain tickseed, is a North American species of perennial tickseeds in the family Asteraceae.  It is native to the southeastern United States from eastern Texas to southeastern Virginia, primarily to the coastal plain.

Coreopsis gladiata is a perennial herb up to 70 cm (28 inches) tall. Flower heads have yellow ray florets and purple disc florets. The species grows in swamps, bogs, depressions, and pine barrens.

References

Plants described in 1788
Flora of the Southeastern United States
gladiata
Flora without expected TNC conservation status